Edward Joseph Erban (July 6, 1921 – May 17, 2008) was an American professional basketball player. He played in the National Basketball League for the Toledo Jim White Chevrolets, Oshkosh All-Stars, and Syracuse Nationals. For his career he averaged 2.1 points per game.

References 

1921 births
2008 deaths
American men's basketball players
United States Marine Corps personnel of World War II
Basketball players from Wisconsin
Centers (basketball)
Forwards (basketball)
Oshkosh All-Stars players
Marquette Golden Eagles men's basketball players
Sportspeople from Oshkosh, Wisconsin
Syracuse Nationals players
Toledo Jim White Chevrolets players
Wisconsin–Oshkosh Titans men's basketball players